Roy Henderson Matthews (born 29 March 1940) is a Scottish footballer who played as an inside right in the Football League.

As a player, he won a treble with Arcadia Shepherds in 1974. NFL Championship, NFL Castle Cup and the NFL UTC Bowl Cup.

As a manager, he led Jomo Cosmos to the National Soccer League title in 1987. The team lost the Mainstay Cup final to Mamelodi Sundowns in 1986.

Honours 
Arcadia Shepherds
NFL Championship: 1974
NFL Castle Cup; 1974
NFL UTC Bowl Cup: 1974

Jomo Cosmos
NSL Championship: 1987

References

External links
Roy Matthews's Career

1940 births
Living people
Sportspeople from Slough
English footballers
Association football inside forwards
Arbroath Victoria F.C. players
Charlton Athletic F.C. players
Arcadia Shepherds F.C. players
English Football League players
Jomo Cosmos F.C. managers
SuperSport United F.C. managers
English football managers
Footballers from Berkshire
Scottish Junior Football Association players